Mohamed Abrouk (born 30 November 1945) is an Algerian footballer. He played in 12 matches for the Algeria national football team from 1967 to 1973. He was also named in Algeria's squad for the 1968 African Cup of Nations tournament.

References

External links
 

1945 births
Living people
Algerian footballers
Algeria international footballers
1968 African Cup of Nations players
Place of birth missing (living people)
Association football goalkeepers
21st-century Algerian people